Langstaff GO Station is a train and bus station in the GO Transit network located in Richmond Hill, Ontario in Canada. It is a stop on the Richmond Hill line train service.

In May 2005, construction of a new and more modern station building was completed, replacing the previous station building at Langstaff Road and using the north end of the same train platform. The south building was converted to a waiting room after the new station building opened for service on June 6, 2005. The new building has a ticket office for passengers to purchase bus and train tickets on weekday mornings.

Langstaff Road East was the original routing of Highway 7 between Yonge Street and Bayview Avenue. When Highway 7 was upgraded, an overpass was constructed over the Canadian National Railway tracks, and the area north of Langstaff road became a large commuter parking lot. With the construction of Highway 407, the south lot was reduced in size, but newer developments north of the former Highway 7 led to the building of the new terminal. The south parking lot has a kiss and ride loop.

Bus connections 

The station is served by GO Transit route 61 which travels between Gormley GO Station and Union Station. This bus route provides service during off-peak times.

All other bus connections are made at Richmond Hill Centre Terminal immediately west of Langstaff station. A pedestrian bridge was opened in March 2008 to connect Richmond Hill Centre Terminal and the GO train station. In 2011, GO Transit moved all Highway 407 East bus services from Langstaff GO Station to Richmond Hill Centre Terminal.

References

External links

GO Transit railway stations
Railway stations in Richmond Hill, Ontario
Railway stations in Canada opened in 1978
1978 establishments in Ontario